Cheer is an American sport television docuseries airing on Netflix starting in January 2020. The six-part series follows the nationally ranked forty-member Navarro College Bulldogs Cheer Team from Corsicana, Texas, under the direction of coach Monica Aldama, as they prepare to compete in the National Cheerleading Championship held annually in Daytona Beach, Florida. The episodes focus especially on five individual Cheer Team members and include elements of the history of cheerleading, including the formation of the National Cheerleaders Association (NCA).

As the series begins, the Cheer Team has won fourteen NCA National Championships in the junior college division, as well as five "Grand Nationals" for the highest score of all teams in the competition. One of their closest competitive rivals, also a junior college, is Trinity Valley Community College in Athens, Texas, roughly forty miles away. The final episode addresses the outsized influence of Varsity Brands—just acquired by Bain Capital—that seems to control most aspects of the billion-dollar competitive cheerleading industry, including broadcast rights of the Daytona finals. The second season premiered on January 12, 2022.

Background 

Cheerleading developed from mere boosterism into a sport gradually; as one team would develop pyramids, baskets, jumps, stunts, and creative tumbling skills from cheerleading, circus arts (like balancing), and dancing—other teams would emulate and build on those tricks. Unlike most college sports, cheerleading has no professional league after college, so the National Cheerleading Championship held annually in Daytona Beach, Florida is the highest-level event where cheerleaders can compete. As of 2020, competitive cheerleading is a billion dollar industry.

Director Greg Whiteley came across competitive cheerleading while filming for his football television series Last Chance U. He was struck by the cheerleaders' athleticism and highly competitive drive.

Navarro College, a “9,000-student community college in Corsicana, Texas, about fifty miles south of Dallas,” has a cheer team coached by Monica Aldama who graduated from Corsicana High School, earned a degree in Finance at the University of Texas at Austin, then a Master of Business Administration at the University of Texas at Tyler. She was a cheerleader in college. Because of her devotion to her extended Texan family, and her husband's desire to raise their children near their families, she accepted the position of cheerleading coach at Navarro College. Starting in 2000, she built the program from the ground up, making it into the best in the nation.

Episodes

Series overview

Season 1 (2020)

Season 2 (2022)

Reception 
On Rotten Tomatoes the series holds an approval rating of 96% based on 23 reviews, with an average of 7.75/10. The website's critics consensus reads: "With an inspirational troupe of teens and willingness to engage in the tougher trials facing the sport today, Cheer perfectly captures the highs and lows of what it takes to be a cheerleader." On Metacritic, it has a weighted average score of 81 out of 100, based on seven critics, indicating "universal acclaim".

The Washington Posts Hank Stuever wrote, "Cheer quickly and effortlessly becomes all-consuming for the viewer. Whiteley superbly structures the story through six episodes to heighten the anxiety as the competition nears." Vulture's Jen Chaney stated, "while it depicts plenty of conflicts and disagreements between the cheerleaders at Navarro College in Corsicana, Texas, it's an ultimately more uplifting show that uses cheer as a prism through which to explore overcoming all kinds of obstacles." Rolling Stone wrote, “...it’s Apocalypse Now with pompoms,” and “It’s not tough to see why America is obsessed with Cheer: At a time when our democratic ideals are smashed to pieces, threatening all our illusions of leadership, Cheer offers a fantasy cheer-ocracy, with Monica as a scarily credible cheer-tator.

In January 2020, the Navarro cheer team and coach Monica appeared on The Ellen DeGeneres Show, and performed a full routine; Ellen DeGeneres presented them with $20,000 toward their fundraising goal. The January 25, 2020, episode of Saturday Night Live had a sketch spoofing Cheer with guest host Adam Driver as one of the coaches apparently unconcerned as team members want to make the mat—the twenty chosen for the finals—so bad they want to cheer despite near-catastrophic injuries. In late January 2020, The Late Show with Stephen Colbert featured a spoof commercial about mat talk, the boisterous positivity sideline cheers that teammates do for the performing members—for which Jerry Harris was singled-out during the series as excelling in—for their performance. The conceit was a new booster Mat Talk for Regular People program whereby the Navarro Cheer Team members would praise everyday people for mundane activities, and featured La'Darius Marshall, Harris, and Gabi Butler cheering people on, with coach Monica Aldama available for a Booster Shot.

Awards and nominations

Notes

References

External links
 

2020s American documentary television series
2020 American television series debuts
Television series by Boardwalk Pictures
Netflix original documentary television series
Cheerleading television series
Navarro College cheerleading
English-language Netflix original programming
Television shows set in Texas
Primetime Emmy Award for Outstanding Reality Program winners